The SEAT 600 is a city car made in Spain by SEAT from May 1957 until August 1973 under licence from Fiat. It helped to start the Spanish miracle (economic boom of 1959–1973) that came at the end of the slow recovery from the Spanish Civil War. It was a relatively inexpensive vehicle (then 60,000 Spanish pesetas) and was the first car that came within the modest but rapidly growing economic means of most Spanish families from the mid-1960s to the early 1970s. The vehicle has become an icon of the period.

The SEAT company was born as a joint venture of the Spanish state holding agency National Institute of Industry, six Spanish banks and Fiat - almost all SEAT models up to 1982 were license-built Fiat-based cars, although the 1200/1430 Sport "Boca negra" and 133 were created in-house by SEAT in the 1970s.

Up to 797,319 SEAT 600s and 18,000 SEAT 800s were made until 1973. They were exported to Argentina, Poland, and Finland. The Fiat version enjoyed far less success in its homeland than the Spanish model, probably because the Italian market was more advanced than the Spanish at the time.

Among the reasons for ending production were the thin and weak B pillars, which made seat belt installation very difficult. The SEAT 600 was replaced by the far less successful SEAT 133, a modernized derivative of the SEAT 850 designed by SEAT.

Technical specifications
The car was technically very basic. It was a license-built Italian Fiat 600 of 1955 with a rear-engined/rear wheel-drive layout. The engine was a four-cylinder, water-cooled unit originally with a displacement of 633 cc producing  and later 767 cc, yielding  at 4600 rpm.

Versions

The two initial series were the 600 and the 600 D two-door saloon, distinguishable by the use of "suicide doors". The third-series 600 E had conventional doors, bigger headlamps, a different plastic grille, and other improvements. The final production run was the 600 L Especial, produced only for a few months in 1973. The design of the SEAT 600 was a two-door saloon (two-door, rear engine).

A commercial body called the SEAT 600 Formichetta was also available.

SEAT 800

A slightly longer, four-door saloon version of the same car, the SEAT 800, was launched in September 1963 and built up to 1968. It was also known as a four-door 600, although the official designation was 800. The SEAT 800 is the four-door derivative of the 600; it had front suicide doors and rear conventional doors mounted on the same B-pillar. This car was only built in Spain.

Tunings
Tuned cars also were produced. The most common ones were prepared by Abarth, but cars were also modified by Conti, Autolinea, and Zakspeed. The brakes and wheels were also changed.

Motorsport
The SEAT 600 has taken part in several competition events, driven by pilots such as Antonio Zanini.

Notes
The Seiscientos was also known as pelotilla (little ball), seílla, or seíta (both stand for little SEAT) and ombligo (navel), because it was very common.

References

External links
 Fiat 600 Club, Argentina
 Seiscientos.org
 600-E600-L Especial600 Abarth 2000 Road Tests
 Club coches clásicos

Francoist Spain
600
Rear-engined vehicles
Rear-wheel-drive vehicles
City cars
Sedans
Cars introduced in 1957
1960s cars
1970s cars
Cars of Spain